Arbasanci is a village in the municipality of Sveti Nikole, North Macedonia.

It is home of a barely excavated archaeological site.

Name
The name is derived from the medieval ethnonym of Albanians, Arban.

Demographics
On the 1927 ethnic map of Leonhard Schulze-Jena, the village is written as "Arabasanci" and shown as without an ethnic marker.According to the 2002 census, the village had 1 inhabitant. Ethnic groups in the village include:

Macedonians 1

References

Villages in Sveti Nikole Municipality